Kettyolaanu Ente Malakha is a 2019 Indian Malayalam-language romantic drama film  directed by Nissam Basheer (in his directorial debut), written by Aji Peter Thankam, and produced by Magic Frames. It stars Asif Ali and Veena Nandakumar, with Manohari Joy, Jaffar Idukki, and Basil Joseph in supporting roles. William Francis composed the film's music. The plot follows newly wed Sleevachan and Rincy as they begin their married life.

Kettyolaanu Ente Malakha was released in theatres on 22 November 2019. The film received positive reviews from critics and was a commercial success at the box office.

Plot 

Sleevachan, a farmer lives with his mother in a village. Despite being over 30 years he has not shown an interest in marriage. Once when he returns home from work, he finds his mother fainted and lying on the kitchen floor. Realising that there should be someone around in the house with his mother while he is away, he decides to get married.

He marries Rincy in an arranged marriage. Since Sleevachan has not much socialised with women and stays a virgin, he is nervous to approach Rincy for making love. Rincy is comfortable and supportive when Sleevachan tries to make an advance, but he draws back. Each night, Sleevachan makes excuses to stay away from home. Rincy begins to suspect Sleevachan is deliberately avoiding her and, when asked, he avoids her question.

While hanging out with friends, Sleevachan hears them saying that wives have high regards for husbands who has shown them good physical potential during sex. On that night, a drunk Sleevachan performs nonconsensual sex on a sleeping Rincy. Rincy is hospitalized with injury. Sleevachan returns to his senses and understands his mistake. Rincy is heartbroken and tells Sleevachan that she does not want to continue their marriage and asks him to take her back to her home.

In the following days, Sleevachan tries to rectify and reconcile by going out of his way to help Rincy. She, however keeps quiet and discourages him. On the night they part away, Rincy tells she forgives Sleevachan and they decide to remain as a couple, and have sex that night. The credits roll by showing the clips of their honeymoon.

Cast 

 Asif Ali as Sleevachan
 Veena Nandakumar as Rincy
 Manohari Joy as Eliyamma / Ammachi
 Basil Joseph as Kunjaambi
 Jaffar Idukki as Kuttiyachan
 Sminu Sijo as Anna
 Rony David as Richard
 Sruthi Lakshmi as Richard's wife
 Alice as Mariyamma Chettathi
 Santhosh Krishnan as Eldose
 Raveendran as Bombay Sajeevan
 Jayalakshmi as Mercy
 Sini Abraham as Jessy
 Jesna Sibi as Celin
 Anu Anil as Ciscily
 Fr. Eldhose Mathew as Fr. Eldhose
 Sandra Sijo as Teena, Anna's daughter
 Maala Parvathi as Dr. Rosamma
 Anju as Betsy
 Ansar Angamali as Binoy
 Shine Tom Chacko as Shine
 Babu Poothara as Babu

Soundtrack

Lyrics are written by B. K. Harinarayanan and Vinayak Sasikumar, all music is composed by William Francis.

Release
The film released on 22 November 2019 across 132 screens in Kerala, to highly positive reviews from the critics as well as the audience. It got the theatre release in Qatar, Oman, Kuwait, Bahrain and UAE on 5 December 2019. It was screened at 51st International Film Festival of India in January 2021 in Indian Panorama section.

Critical reception
Anna Mathews of The Times of India rated the film with 3 stars out of 5, and said that "there are no tense, twisty moments. It's a simple story, nicely acted by even the supporting cast, and actually feels quite pleasant to watch an uncomplicated love story that makes you tear up and smile at the end". She praised the performances of Asif Ali, Veena Nandakumar and the rest. Baradwaj Rangan of Film Companion wrote that "this could be a fascinating case study of how "arrogance" on screen (like in Arjun Reddy) makes it less easy for us to fully embrace a character, while innocence and humility make us sympathise more readily".

Box office
The film received positive reviews from the critics and became commercial success. The film collected ₹21.08 lakhs from 6 weeks in the United States box office.

Awards

 Kerala State Film Awards for Best Male Singer - Najim Arshad
 9th South Indian International Movie Awards for Best Comedian- Malayalam -  Basil Joseph

References

External links
 

2010s Malayalam-language films
Indian family films
Indian drama films
2019 directorial debut films
2019 films
Films about couples
Films about domestic violence
Films about sexual abuse
Films about rape
Films about farmers
2019 drama films